Cockie van der Elst (26 June 1928 – 6 September 2021) was a Dutch speed skater. He competed in two events at the 1952 Winter Olympics.

References

External links
 

1928 births
2021 deaths
Dutch male speed skaters
Olympic speed skaters of the Netherlands
Speed skaters at the 1952 Winter Olympics
Sportspeople from Rotterdam